E380 may refer to:
Triammonium citrate, a food additive known as E380 in the European E number system.
FS Class E.380, a class of Italian electric locomotives